The Elliott House is a historic house at 309 Pine Street in Fordyce, Arkansas.  The -story wood-frame house was built in 1925, and is a well-executed example of Craftsman style.  It is a rectangular structure with three overlapping gabled roof sections with different pitches.  The eaves are wide, and decorated with knee braces and exposed purlins.  A fourth gable extends over the main entry, which has a twelve-light door with flanking sidelight windows.

The house was listed on the National Register of Historic Places in 1984.

See also
National Register of Historic Places listings in Dallas County, Arkansas

References

Houses on the National Register of Historic Places in Arkansas
Houses completed in 1925
Houses in Dallas County, Arkansas
Buildings and structures in Fordyce, Arkansas
National Register of Historic Places in Dallas County, Arkansas